Yambe is a Bantu language of the Gabonese rain forest, near the related language Shiwe.

References

Makaa-Njem languages
Languages of Cameroon